Wolf Hole is a ghost town in the Arizona Strip region of Mohave County, Arizona, United States.  It consists only of some foundations and a derelict house.

The author Edward Abbey sometimes claimed to be a resident of Wolf Hole.

Geography

See also
 Mount Trumbull Wilderness

References

External links
 Wolf Hole at GhostTowns.com, includes photos

Ghost towns in Arizona
Former populated places in Mohave County, Arizona
1918 establishments in Arizona